Mikkel Jespersen (born 11 June 1991) is a Danish footballer who plays for Kolding IF.

Club career

Skive
Jespersen came to Skive IK in January 2011. He played 127 games in total for the club, scoring 25 goals, before leaving the club in 2015.

Horsens
On 29 June 2015 it was announced, that Jespersen had signed for Horsens on a one-year deal. After playing one year in the Danish 1st Division, Jespersen and Horsens won promotion to the Danish Superliga. His contract got extended in May 2016 with further one year.

Later career
While playing for Skive which he returned to in the summer 2018, Jespersen announced in the beginning of July 2019 that he was helping Horsens manager Bo Henriksen scouting players in the Danish football divisions. On 31 July 2019, Horsens officially confirmed, that they had hired Jespersen as responsible for the recruitment and individual coach for the first team of the club alongside his playing career at Skive.

In June 2021, Jespersen joined Kolding IF as a player. Alongside this, Jespersen was also assigned to the club's academy, where he was going to be responsible for recruitment and individual development. In January 2023, Jespersen was given a new position as playing assistant coach of the first team; a position that Niki Zimling had just left.

References

Danish men's footballers
Danish 1st Division players
Danish Superliga players
1991 births
Living people
Skive IK players
AC Horsens players
Viborg FF players
Association football midfielders
Silkeborg IF players
Kolding IF players